United States gubernatorial elections were held in 1919, in six states. Kentucky, Louisiana, Maryland and Mississippi held their gubernatorial elections in odd numbered years, every 4 years, preceding the United States presidential election year. New Jersey at this time held gubernatorial elections every 3 years, which it would abandon in 1949. This was the last time Massachusetts elected its governors to a single-year term, switching to two years from the 1920 election.

Results

References

Notes

 
November 1919 events